The Church St. George, Beljakovce (Црква „Свети Ѓорѓи“ Бељаковце) is an Eastern Orthodox church in Beljakovce, Kumanovo, North Macedonia.

References

Kumanovo Municipality
Eastern Orthodox church buildings in North Macedonia
Macedonian Orthodox churches